Hüseyin Türkmen (born 1 January 1998) is a Turkish professional footballer who plays as a central defender for Süper Lig club Trabzonspor.

Professional career
On 30 November 2017, Hüseyin signed his first professional contract with his local club Trabzonspor. Hüseyin made his professional debut for Trabzonspor in a 3-1 Süper Lig win over Bursaspor on 12 May 2018.

Honours
Trabzonspor
Turkish Cup: 2019–20
Turkish Super Cup (2): 2020, 2022
Süper Lig: 2021–22

References

External links
 
 
 
 Trabzonspor profile

1998 births
Living people
People from Akçaabat
Turkish footballers
Turkey youth international footballers
Trabzonspor footballers
Süper Lig players
Association football defenders